Mustafa Bumin (born 26 June 1940 in Mucur, Kırşehir Province) is a former Turkish judge. He was president of the Constitutional Court of Turkey from May 31, 2000 until June 24, 2005.

Under his presidency of the Constitutional court the People's Democracy Party (HADEP) was closed down as the part was viewed to be a threat to the indivisibility of Turkey.

References

External links
Web-site of the Constitutional Court of Turkey 

1940 births
Living people
People from Mucur
Turkish judges
Turkish civil servants
Presidents of the Constitutional Court of Turkey
Members of the Council of State (Turkey)